Poritia phalena, the broad-banded brilliant, is a small butterfly found in India and South-East Asia that belongs to the lycaenids or blues family. The species was first described by William Chapman Hewitson in 1874.

Range
It occurs in South Asia from Assam in India to southern Myanmar. As per Markku Savela, the butterfly ranges from Assam, Myanmar, Peninsular Malaya, Java, Nias, Borneo and Thailand.

Status
Very rare.

Description
It is a small butterfly with a 28 to 34 mm wingspan. The male is black above with brilliant greenish-blue streaks and spots, while the female is dark brown above with a white circular spot in the discal region of the forewing. Below, there are no bands of linked spots.

Taxonomy
The butterfly was earlier and continues to be classified by some authorities as Simiskina phalena (Hewitson, 1874).
The subspecies that occur in South Asia are:
 P. p. harterti Doherty 1889 – Assam to southern Myanmar, very rare
 P. p. hayashii (Schröder & Treadaway, 1979)
 P. p. howarthi (H. Hayashi, 1976)
 P. p. ilagana Osada & Hashimoto, [1987]
 P. p. javanica Fruhstorfer – Java
 P. p. niasina Fruhstorfer – Nias

See also
List of butterflies of India
List of butterflies of India (Lycaenidae)

Cited references

References

External links
 With images.

Poritia
Butterflies of Asia
Butterflies of Borneo
Taxa named by William Chapman Hewitson
Butterflies described in 1874